An LED printer is a type of computer printer similar to a laser printer. Such a printer uses a light-emitting diode (LED) array as a light source in the printhead instead of the laser used in laser printers and, more generally, in the xerography process. The LED bar pulse-flashes across the entire page width and produces the image on the print drum or belt as it moves past.

LEDs are more efficient and reliable than conventional laser printers, since they have fewer moving parts, allowing for less mechanical wear.  Depending on design, LED printers can have faster rates of print than some laser-based designs, and are generally cheaper to manufacture. In contrast to LED printers, laser printers require combinations of rotating mirrors and lenses that must remain in alignment throughout their use. The LED print head has no moving parts, and the individual assemblies tend to be more compact.

History 
Oki Electric Industry claims to have made the first LED printer in 1981. A commercialized variant called OPP6220 was developed in 1986. It was a compact monotonic printer with a resolution of 240 dpi and a speed of 16 ppm. A 1989 model called OL400 was noted for its low cost. By 1997, Oki has pushed the resolution to 1200 dpi, and has produced upscaled models that handle A3-sized paper. The OKIPAGE 8c from 1998 was the first color LED printer for OKI. It simply utilizes a tandem array of four LED-toner pairs.

Variants 
OKI Data has developed specialty LED Printers that use a CMYW toner system rather than CMYK. The OKI 920WT and 711WT have been developed for apparel-decorating processes, replacing the typical black toners ("K") with a white toner. The purpose is to allow the heat transfer application to dark fabrics and maintain the vibrancy of the colors. The LED immediately prints and dries the full color image onto a velum-like material, which is then heat-pressed to an adhesive sheet for application.

References

External links 
 

Computer printers
Non-impact printing